Fırat Kocaoğlu (born 5 February 1988) is a Turkish professional footballer who plays as a goalkeeper.

External links
Fırat Kocaoğlu at the Turkish Football Federation

1988 births
Living people
Footballers from Ankara
Turkish footballers
Turkey B international footballers
Turkey under-21 international footballers
Association football goalkeepers
Galatasaray A2 footballers
Galatasaray S.K. footballers
Beylerbeyi S.K. footballers
Kasımpaşa S.K. footballers
Boluspor footballers
Adanaspor footballers
Çaykur Rizespor footballers
Sarıyer S.K. footballers
TFF First League players